is a passenger railway station located in the city of Higashimurayama, Tokyo, Japan, operated by the private railway operator Seibu Railway. It functions as an interchange between the Seibu Haijima Line and the Seibu Tamako Line, which both offer through services to the Seibu Shinjuku Line.

Lines 
Hagiyama Station is served by the Seibu Tamako Line and Seibu Haijima Line, with some through services to and from the Seibu Shinjuku Line.

Services
Eastbound Seibu Haijima Line trains for Kodaira and central Tokyo (  and ) depart from Track 3.

Most trains to  leave from Track 2. These trains are direct trains from Seibu Shinjuku Line.

Trains to/from Kokubunji, central Tokyo, and Tamako are timed to connect with each other and generally depart approximately every 10 minutes. Trains to Kokubunji occasionally depart from Platform 3, when Platform 1 is occupied by through trains to Tamako. This is due to the track layout.

All local and express trains stop at Hagiyama.

During the morning rush hours, some trains from Tamako and Haijima are coupled at Platform 3 to form ten-car express trains to central Tokyo.

Station Layout 

The elevated station concourse serves as a bridge connecting the two platforms. Access to the concourse is available from both the north and south side of the tracks, by lifts and stairs.  At the south exit, the bridge also extends over the main road, facilitating crossing, although lift access is not available on the far side of the road. During opening hours, the concourse can be used by pedestrians wishing to traverse the railway tracks. Opposite the ticket office, three gates control access to the platforms. Lifts and stairs descend to the east end of the platforms that are at street level. A cross-over foot bridge is also provided at the west end of the platforms to allow easy transfer between lines.

Platforms

The station consists of two platforms. One is an island platform serving trains on Tracks 1 and 2, and the other is a side platform serving trains on Track 3.

Hours of operation 
Hagiyama Station's ticket office is open between 7:00 and 20:00.

Facilities
The station has sets of toilets at concourse level both outside and inside the ticket gates. The station has a staffed ticket office, as well as automatic ticket machines. Multilingual and Braille signage is available throughout the station. Within the ticket gates, a small kiosk operates at peak times. Several vending machines selling hot and cold beverages are distributed about the station

Taxis pick up passengers at the south exit. Bicycle parking is available for a fee outside the north side of the station, as is a small car parking lot.

History 
The Hagiyama to Kokubunji section of this line now forms the Seibu Tamako Line. This realignment means that it is no longer possible to run trains from Kodaira to Kokubunji.

In 1992, automatic ticket-collecting machines were installed.

Station numbering was introduced on all Seibu Railway lines during fiscal 2012, with Hagiyama Station becoming "SS30" on the Haijima Line and "ST04" on the Tamako Line.

2008 refurbishment

A major refurbishment was completed in November 2008. As part of this work, four lifts were installed allowing step-free access to all platforms and from street level at both entrances. Additional barrier-free improvements include new universal access toilets and a Braille map of the station. This work followed campaign from local residents demanding this provision. The concourse was upgraded with additional toilets and new stairways and extensive external landscaping was carried out to the west entrance and east entrance, providing retail space for a  stand-up noodle vendor adjacent to the station. Signage was upgraded on the platforms to the new Seibu Railways standard and multilingual concourse signs (Japanese, English, Chinese, and Korean) were also installed.

Passenger statistics
In fiscal 2019, the station was the 68th busiest on the Seibu network with an average of 10,118 passengers daily. 

The passenger figures for previous years are as shown below.

Surrounding area
Although Hagiyama Station is located on the edge the city of Higashimurayama in western Tokyo, its south entrance exits to the city of Kodaira.

The station provides the main access for the National Hospital Center of Neurology and Psychiatry (NCNP), one of the six National Medical Research Centers, which contains the National Institute of Neuroscience and the National Institute of Mental Health, and the National Musashi Hospital.

A Seibu Railway maintenance depot is located adjacent to Hagiyama Station. This depot provides workshops, offices, and storage, as well as dormitory accommodation for Seibu employees. The depot is located on the Seibu Tamako Line and an access route along the line provides direct access between the dormitories and Hagiyama Station.

Outside the north exit is Kodaira Green Road, a 21 km dedicated cycling and walking road circling Kodaira.

Also nearby is the headquarters and factory of Bridgestone Corporation, as well as the Tokyo Metropolitan Hagiyama business school.

See also
List of railway stations in Japan

References

External links 

Seibu Railway page for Hagiyama Station
 Kodaira Green Road Homepage (in Japanese
Sayama Sakai Scenic Road

Railway stations in Tokyo
Railway stations in Japan opened in 1928
Stations of Seibu Railway
Seibu Tamako Line
Seibu Haijima Line
Higashimurayama, Tokyo